Kete is a surname. Notable people with the surname include:

Emma Kete (born 1987), New Zealand footballer
Molefi Kete Asante (born 1942), American academic, historian and philosopher
Naia Kete (born 1990), American reggae singer and contestant on the second season of "The Voice"